The Khandadhar Falls is located at Nandapani, Bonaigarh in Sundargarh district in the Indian state of Odisha. It is the 9th highest waterfall in India and  second highest waterfall in Odisha after Barehipani Falls in Mayurbhanj.

Location

The falls
It looks like a sword that's why it named as khanda(sword) dhara waterfall.

Legend
There is an interesting legend amongst the Pauri Bhuiya tribals who inhabit the area around Khandadhar. The legend is reproduced from Outlook (magazine):

“A Pauri Bhuiya legend speaks of how their mountains came to be so munificent. The Sundergarh branch of the community was once possessed by a rapacious goddess named Kankala Devi, who consumed trees, soil and everything else. In despair, the Pauri Bhuiya placed her on a rock, which she ate through as well—creating a deep hole from which poured out the Khandadhara (split-rock waterfall). So they had water. Then a couple from the community went to visit relatives at the eastern, or Keonjhar, end of the Khandadhar mountain range. Their prospective hosts were away but a pile of grains had been left outdoors and, amazingly, not even the birds were eating it. Inside the heap, the couple discovered a small goddess, Kanta Kumari, protector of the region’s prosperity. They stole her and brought her back to Sundergarh, and so her bounty became theirs.”

Impact of mining
The Kalinga Commercial Corporation Limited operates the Kurmitar mine on the Khandadhar hill range spread over 133 hectares. It exports iron ore to China and manganese ore to Korea. The diversion of a mountaintop stream has resulted in partial drying up of the Khandadhara Falls. The state owned Odisha Mineral Corporation has mines in the area spread over 1,212.hectares. It has signed agreements with Adhunik Metaliks and Rexon Strips for supply of iron ore. Odisha government intends to lease out 2,500 hectares to POSCO India. There has been protests locally and the matter has gone to court. As of 2012 court judgement is awaited.

See also
List of waterfalls in India
List of waterfalls in India by height

References

External links

 Map showing route from Rourkela to Khandadhar Falls
 Khandadhar Waterfall of Sundergarh District

Waterfalls of Odisha
Sundergarh district